The Keland House, also known as the Keland-Johnson House, located in Racine, Wisconsin, in the United States, was designed by Frank Lloyd Wright in 1954, almost 50 years after he designed the Thomas P. Hardy House in Racine. It is currently known as the Boyd Home.

Background
The residence is on a bluff, cantilevered over the Root River and overlooking Colonial Park. The only furniture that Wright designed for the home were built-ins: ledges, bookcases, cabinets and sofas. The first time Wright visited the home after it was completed, he proceeded to rearrange the furniture.  It has multiple wings, with an inner atrium. The primary construction material is brick, with a copper roof.

The Keland House is an example of Wright's Usonian Homes, though larger than most of his Usonian homes. The dining area flows into the living room, with the kitchen at the "hinge" of the dining room and living room.

The home was designed for the daughter of Herbert Fisk Johnson, Jr., Karen, and her first husband Willard Keland. The home was transferred upon their divorce to Karen Johnson, later Karen Johnson Boyd, who lived there until her death in 2016.

References

Sources 
 Storrer, William Allin. The Frank Lloyd Wright Companion. University Of Chicago Press, 2006,  (S. 368)

Frank Lloyd Wright buildings
Buildings and structures in Racine, Wisconsin
Houses in Racine County, Wisconsin
Samuel Curtis Johnson family
Houses completed in 1954
1954 establishments in Wisconsin